Akkoyunlu can refer to:

 Akkoyunlu, Başmakçı
 Akkoyunlu, Çermik
 Akkoyunlu, Çobanlar
 the Turkish name for Aq Qoyunlu